These are the election results of the 2018 Malaysian general election by state constituency. State assembly elections were held in Malaysia on 9 May 2018 as part of the general elections. Results are expected to come on the same day, after 5 pm. Elected members of the legislative assembly (MLAs) will be representing their constituency from the first sitting of respective state legislative assembly to its dissolution.

The state legislature election deposit was set at RM5,000 per candidate. Similar to previous elections, the election deposit will be forfeited if the particular candidate had failed to secure at least 12.5% or one-eighth of the votes.

Perlis

Kedah

Kelantan

Terengganu

Penang

Perak

Pahang

Selangor

Negeri Sembilan

Malacca

Johor

Sabah

References 

2018
2018 elections in Malaysia
2018 in Malaysia
Election results in Malaysia